Clefamide (trade name Mebinol) is an antiprotozoal agent that was used to treat amoebiasis in the 1960s. There is no evidence for any later use of the drug.

References 

Organochlorides
Nitrobenzenes
Antiprotozoal agents
Acetamides
Diphenyl ethers
Primary alcohols